Rowghan Garan (also Romanized as Rowghan Garān) is a village in Miyan Velayat Rural District, in the Central District of Mashhad County, Razavi Khorasan Province, Iran. At the 2006 census, its population was 21, in 4 families.

References 

Populated places in Mashhad County